El Saturn Records is an American record label founded in 1957 by Alton Abraham. Among the earliest African American-owned record labels, in the late 1950s and 1960s it was one of the most active artist-owned record labels in the United States. The best known  releases by the label are albums by Sun Ra and his groups.

The label is currently owned by Ihnfinity Inc. where Anita A. Abraham IS the President.

References

External links 
 Afterschool Sound Records

American record labels
Jazz record labels